The 1938–39 Oklahoma Sooners men's basketball team represented the University of Oklahoma in the 1938–39 NCAA men's basketball season as a member of the Big Six Conference. They finished the season with a 12–9 overall record, and tied for the Big Six Conference title with a 7–3 conference record. The Sooners made it to the Final Four of the 1939 NCAA basketball tournament. They were coached by Bruce Drake in his first season as head coach of the Sooners. They played their home games at McCasland Field House in Norman, Oklahoma.

Schedule

|-
!colspan=12 style=| Regular season

|-
!colspan=12 style=| NCAA Tournament

References

Oklahoma
Oklahoma Sooners men's basketball seasons
Oklahoma
NCAA Division I men's basketball tournament Final Four seasons
Oklahoma Sooners B
Oklahoma Sooners B